Camano Island State Park is publicly owned recreation area on Camano Island in Puget Sound located  southwest of Stanwood in Island County, Washington, United States.  The park occupies   and has  of shoreline. It is managed by the Washington State Parks and Recreation Commission.

History
The park was established in 1949. It took just one day for 900 volunteers from Camano Island to complete the initial work on the park.

Nature
A wide variety of animals make their homes in the woods, beaches and waters of Camano Island State Park. Mammals include mule deer, elk, skunks, coyotes, chipmunks, rabbits, raccoon, whales, and otters. Fish, shellfish, crustaceans and other sea life in the waters of the park include crabs, sea cucumber, trout, cod, crappie, perch, sharks and eels. A variety of birds are found in the park including bald eagles, owls, osprey, ducks, geese, gulls, hummingbirds, wrens, and herons. These animals live among trees and plants like cedar, Douglas fir, spruce, alder, yew, seaweed, rhododendron, Indian pipe and thistle.

Recreation
The park features swimming and diving, fishing, clamming and crabbing, cabin rentals, an 88-site tent campground, group camp, restroom and shower facilities for campers, and a picnic area.

References

External links

Camano Island State Park Washington State Parks and Recreation Commission 
Camano Island State Park Map Washington State Parks and Recreation Commission

Parks in Island County, Washington
State parks of Washington (state)
Protected areas established in 1949
1949 establishments in Washington (state)